Sharvari Wagh, known mononymously as Sharvari (born 14 June 1997) is an Indian actress who works in Hindi films. She started her career in 2015 as an assistant director for Luv Ranjan and Sanjay Leela Bhansali before making her acting debut in 2020 with Kabir Khan's web series The Forgotten Army - Azaadi Ke Liye. Wagh's film debut in Yash Raj Films's Bunty Aur Babli 2 (2021) won her the Filmfare Award for Best Female Debut.

Early life 
She was born in a Marathi family in 1997. Her parents are Shailesh Wagh, a builder and Namrata Wagh, an architect. She studied at Mumbai's The Dadar Parsee Youths Assembly High School and Ruparel College. Manohar Joshi, former chief minister of Maharashtra, is her maternal grandfather.

Career
Wagh has worked as an assistant director in the movies Pyaar Ka Punchnama 2, Bajirao Mastani and Sonu Ke Titu Ki Sweety. She said she had been auditioning since 2014 for a main role in movies. She made her acting debut with the 2020 Amazon Prime series The Forgotten Army - Azaadi Ke Liye opposite Sunny Kaushal.

Wagh made her film debut alongside Rani Mukerji, Saif Ali Khan and Siddhant Chaturvedi in Bunty Aur Babli 2, which was released on 19 November 2021. Her performance won her the Filmfare Award for Best Female Debut.

She will next appear in Maharaja along with Junaid Khan and Shalini Pandey.

Filmography

Films

Web series

Awards and nominations

See also 

 List of Hindi film actresses

References

External links 

 
 Sharvari Wagh at Bollywood Hungama

1996 births
Living people
Actresses in Hindi cinema
Actresses from Mumbai
21st-century Indian actresses